Choi Jeong (born 7 October 1996), or Choi Jung, is a South Korean professional Go player.

A student of Yoo Chang-hyuk, Choi Jeong became a professional Go player in 2010. Her first tournament championship was the Female Myungin in 2012, a title which she held for five years up to end of the tournament in 2016. She has won six women's international titles: four times in the Bingsheng Cup (2014, 2017, 2018, 2019) and twice in the Wu Qingyuan Cup (2019, 2021). In December 2019, she became the first woman to reach the top 20 in the Korea Baduk Association's official ranking of Korean Go players. In November 2022, she became the first woman to reach the finals in a major world tournament.

References

External links
Choi Jeong's profile at Hanguk Kiwon

1996 births
Living people
South Korean Go players
Female Go players